Vihor may refer to:
 FK Vihor, a football club from Budva, Montenegro
 Vihor River, a river in Poland and Ukraine
 Vihor, a neighbourhood of Borča in Belgrade, Serbia

See also 
 Ivan Vihor (born 1997), Croatian pianist and chess player
 Operation Vihor, a Croatian Army offensive of 1991